Andy Rolland (born 12 November 1942, in Cowdenbeath) is a Scottish former footballer who played as a right back.

Career
Rolland began his senior career in 1961 with Cowdenbeath but was released at the end of the season. After a spell in junior football, he returned to Central Park in 1964 and remained for three seasons, before a £10,000 move to Dundee United in 1967. Rolland played at Tannadice for eleven seasons, picking up a Scottish Cup runners-up medal and making some 429 competitive appearances, putting him in the top ten for United players. In summer 1978, Rolland moved to the US to play in the North American Soccer League, featuring for Fort Lauderdale Strikers and Los Angeles Aztecs, the latter involving a swap deal for George Best. Rolland returned to Scotland after the summer and signed for Dunfermline, where he scored the all important penalty in the last game of the 1978–79 season v Falkirk to secure promotion for The Pars as runners up to Berwick Rangers Midway through 1980–81, Rolland returned to Cowdenbeath for a third spell, becoming player/manager shortly afterwards. During that season, Rolland missed the all-important penalty in a match which denied Cowden promotion. Rolland left the club in March 1982, and later returned to junior football at the age of 40 with Leven Juniors.

Although Rolland never appeared for Scotland, he was selected for the Scottish League team against the Football League at Hampden in 1976. This was the final of these matches, as this occasion drew less than 9,000 spectators.

Honours
  Scottish Cup Runner-up
 1973–74

See also
 List of footballers in Scotland by number of league appearances (500+)

References

External links
 Cowdenbeath FC: Andy Rolland
 NASL stats

1942 births
Living people
Scottish footballers
Cowdenbeath F.C. players
Dundee United F.C. players
North American Soccer League (1968–1984) players
Fort Lauderdale Strikers (1977–1983) players
Los Angeles Aztecs players
Dunfermline Athletic F.C. players
Scottish football managers
Cowdenbeath F.C. managers
Scottish Football League managers
People from Cowdenbeath
Scottish Football League players
Scottish Football League representative players
Scottish expatriate footballers
Expatriate soccer players in the United States
Association football fullbacks
Dundonald Bluebell F.C. players
Scottish expatriate sportspeople in the United States